Serghaya or Sirghaya is a small town located in the Damascus countryside in south west Syria. According to the Syria Central Bureau of Statistics (CBS), Serghaya had a population of 7,501 in the 2004 census. Its inhabitants are predominantly Sunni Muslims.

Geography 
It is at the foot of the Anti-Lebanon Mountain. 
Serghaya has a moderate climate with a temperature that varies from 25 to 32 degrees Celsius all summer season and cold climate with temperature varies from -5 up to 10 all winter when snow covers the land and mountain.

It is connected to Damascus via Al-Zabadani and also has old rail reaches to Beirut via Riyaq (or Rayak), Bekaa.

Nearby Towns
 West :`Utayb (3.5 nm) 
 North: Yahfufah (3.4 nm), Al Khuraybah (4.0 nm), Ma`rabun (3.4 nm) 
 East: Al `Uwayni (0.4 nm)
 South: `Ayn al Hawr (2.2 nm)

Climate
In Serghaya, there is a cool summer Mediterranean climate. Rainfall is higher in winter than in summer. The Köppen-Geiger climate classification is Csc. About  of precipitation falls annually.

Economy 
Economy for this town is based on agricultural activities and the main crops are (Apple, Cherry, Pear, Peach and Apricot).

References

Bibliography

 

Populated places in Al-Zabadani District
Towns in Syria